Chanda Rubin and Sandrine Testud were the defending champions, but none competed this year. Rubin decided to focus on the singles tournament, while Testud decided to rest after competing on the World Group Play-offs of the Fed Cup.

Janet Lee and Wynne Prakusya won the title by defeating Nicole Arendt and Caroline Vis 3–6, 6–3, 6–3 in the final.

Seeds

Draw

Draw

References
 Official Results Archive (ITF)
 Official Results Archive (WTA)

Bank of the West Classic - Doubles
Silicon Valley Classic